Kevin J. Rooney (born January 13, 1960) is an American Republican Party politician who has represented the 40th Legislative District in the New Jersey General Assembly since his appointment on December 12, 2016. Rooney served in the General Assembly as Deputy Republican Whip from 2021 to 2022 and has served as the Deputy Minority Conference Leader since 2022. Before serving in the Assembly, Rooney served as a Committeeman in Wyckoff.

Early and personal life 
Rooney was born in Paterson, New Jersey. He is a lifelong Bergen County resident and grew up in Upper Saddle River. He graduated in 1977 from Northern Highlands Regional High School in Allendale, graduated in 1980 from Ramapo College for Business and attended Cook College of Rutgers University for arboriculture.

Rooney won the 2013 version of the Food Network series Chopped, donating his $10,000 winnings to Oasis – A Haven for Women and Children based in Paterson.

Rooney is the Managing Partner of HMS Global Holdings, LLC. He resides in Wyckoff with his wife Hayley Shotmeyer Rooney. They have four children and four grandchildren.

Early political career 
Rooney served on the Wyckoff Zoning Board from 1999 to 2009. He was first elected to the Wyckoff Township Committee in 2009 and was as a member until 2016. He served as Deputy Mayor in 2010 and 2014, and as Mayor in 2011, 2015 and 2016.

New Jersey General Assembly 
In December 2016, Rooney became an Assemblyman representing the 40th Legislative District of New Jersey when he was selected to complete Scott Rumana's term in the Assembly when Rumana resigned his seat after he was appointed to serve as a judge in New Jersey Superior Court.

Committee assignments 
Committee assignments for the current session are:
Appropriations
Consumer Affairs

District 40 
Each of the 40 districts in the New Jersey Legislature has one representative in the New Jersey Senate and two members in the New Jersey General Assembly. The representatives from the 40th District for the 2022—23 Legislative Session are:
Senator Kristin Corrado (R)
Assemblyman Christopher DePhillips (R)
Assemblyman Kevin J. Rooney (R)

Electoral history

New Jersey Assembly

2019 
In 2019, Democrats Maria Martini Cordonnier and Micheal Sedon won the primary to challenge Rooney and his running mate Christopher DePhillips. However, Sedon dropped out of the general election and was replaced with former Bergen County Freeholder Julie O'Brien. During the election, Rooney and DePhillips skipped a debate hosted by the League of Women Voters, claiming it was unfair. The Democrats lost to the incumbents.

2017 
In the 2017 election incumbent David C. Russo retired, so Republican Christopher DePhillips ran for the open seat as a team with Rooney. Democrats Christine Ordway and Paul Vagianos and independent Anthony J. Pellechia also vied for the two Assembly seats. Rooney and DePhillips won the general election.

References

External links
Legislative webpage for Assemblyman Rooney

1960 births
Living people
Mayors of places in New Jersey
Republican Party members of the New Jersey General Assembly
Politicians from Paterson, New Jersey
People from Upper Saddle River, New Jersey
People from Wyckoff, New Jersey
Politicians from Bergen County, New Jersey
Ramapo College alumni
Rutgers University alumni
21st-century American politicians